Xenorhabdus indica  is a bacterium from the genus of Xenorhabdus which has been isolated from the nematodes Steinernema thermophilum and Steinernema yirgalemense. Xenorhabdus indica produces the Taxlllaids A–G.

References

Further reading

External links
Type strain of Xenorhabdus indica at BacDive -  the Bacterial Diversity Metadatabase

Bacteria described in 2009